Loa Dika Toua (born 23 June 1984) is a Papua New Guinean Olympian weightlifter. She competed at the 2020 Summer Olympics, in Women's −49 kg.

She competes regularly in the 53 kg weight class. She is a 12 time, and current, Oceania titlist and a Commonwealth titlist. She is also the current Pacific Games champion.

Career

Olympic games
At just 16 years of age, she was the inaugural woman to lift weight at an Olympic event, competing in the 48 kg category at the Sydney 2000 Summer Olympics. Toua finished in tenth place with a total lift of 117.5 kg.

She was the national flag bearer at the Athens 2004 Summer Olympics opening ceremony. This time competing in the women's 53 kg weight class, she lifted a total of 177.5 kg to place in sixth position.

Toua qualified for Papua New Guinea in the women's 53 kg event at the 2008 Summer Olympics in Beijing. There she ranked 7th with a total lift of 184 kg which was her highest personal lift overall at any Olympics she has attended to date.

She again, for the fourth consecutive time, represented Papua New Guinea at the London 2012 Summer Olympics. Lifting a total of 174 kg, the veteran weightlifter finished in 12th after Zulfiya Chinshanlo of Kazakhstan and Cristina Iovu of Moldova were disqualified.

She represented Papua New Guinea, for the fifth  time at the 2020 Summer Olympics.

Commonwealth games
In 2002 she attended the Manchester Commonwealth Games at the 48kg weight category, lifting 75kg in the clean and jerk which would have placed her 4th, official records show no weight in the snatch.

In 2006, she won the silver medal in the 53 kg weight class at the 2006 Commonwealth Games. It was her first major achievement at an international competition.

Competing in the same category at the 2014 Commonwealth Games, she won the silver medal, with a lift of 193 kg, just 3 kilos short of the gold and new games record. Days later, the original gold medalist, 16-year-old Chika Amalaha of Nigeria failed a doping test and was stripped of her medal and placement. With the medals redistributed, Toua was now the gold medalist and her lift of 193 kg became the new games record.

In 2018, competing in her third games in the Gold Coast she placed second once again for her second Commonwealth games silver and third medal overall. She was 10 kilos behind the gold medalist after failing her last two lifts. A month after the games ended the International Weightlifting Federation, in June, announced that the original winner, Khumukcham Sanjita Chanu of India, tested positive for testosterone from her A sample after the 2017 World Championships. The IWF had stated that if the Indian weightlifters B sample also returns positive. In January 2019 the IWF has revoked the provisional suspension of Chanu and let to keep her gold medal.

She finished in 5th place in the women's 49 kg event at the 2022 Commonwealth Games held in Birmingham, England.

Major results

Personal life
Toua gave birth to her first child in 2007 to husband, Mavera Gavera. She now has two children, Paul and Ani-Geua. She owns her own weightlifting club in Port Moresby.

References

External links

Athlete Biography at beijing2008
Yahoo! Sports

1984 births
Living people
Papua New Guinean female weightlifters
Weightlifters at the 2000 Summer Olympics
Weightlifters at the 2004 Summer Olympics
Weightlifters at the 2008 Summer Olympics
Weightlifters at the 2012 Summer Olympics
Weightlifters at the 2020 Summer Olympics
Olympic weightlifters of Papua New Guinea
Weightlifters at the 2006 Commonwealth Games
Weightlifters at the 2014 Commonwealth Games
Weightlifters at the 2018 Commonwealth Games
Weightlifters at the 2022 Commonwealth Games
Commonwealth Games silver medallists for Papua New Guinea
Commonwealth Games gold medallists for Papua New Guinea
Commonwealth Games medallists in weightlifting
People from the National Capital District (Papua New Guinea)
Medallists at the 2006 Commonwealth Games
Medallists at the 2014 Commonwealth Games
Medallists at the 2018 Commonwealth Games